Metalab is a hackerspace in Vienna's central first district.

Metalab may also refer to:

MetaLab, Ltd., an interface design firm located in Victoria, British Columbia
ibiblio, a digital library and archive project